The MARA Junior Science College (MJSC) is a group of boarding schools created by Majlis Amanah Rakyat (MARA), a Malaysian government agency. The institution provides learning facilities for bright students in local schools throughout Malaysia.

The first MRSM was established in Seremban in February 1972 with its first intake of 150 pioneering (male only) students from all over Malaysia. MRSM Seremban took in its last batch of students in 1986 and gradually converted into Kolej Mara Seremban officially in February 1994.

Academic system 
Students are primarily assessed through a system similar to the grading systems in universities and/or colleges: the grade point average (GPA) ( system. By the end of their final semesters they will be awarded a certificate of graduation for those who succeeded to pass with at least a cumulative grade point average (CGPA) of 2.00 and above.

Applicants take the Form 3 Assessment and the Malaysian Education Certificate national examinations.

MJSCs use the usual academic ladders in Malaysia when it comes to the level progression system, where students advance through year 7 (known as Form 1 in Malaysia) to Year 11 (Form 5) by age. In Malaysia, there is no system that allows for level transition according to the student's capability. Most MJSC runs all levels from Form 1 to Form 5, but there are 3 MJSCs that only run Forms 4 and 5. In 2015, there are no more MJSCs that only run Forms 1 to 3. All of these previous lower form only MJSCs have been enrolling upper form with MJSC Pasir Tumboh and MJSC Gerik both had their form 4 intakes in 2015 (SPM 2016).

Students who started from Form 1 can continue their studies in MJSC until Form 5 in the same college or by transferring to another college. MJSC implemented Dual Language Programme (DLP) but the medium of teaching is mostly conducted in English.

See also
 Sekolah Berasrama Penuh

References

 
Educational institutions established in 1972
1972 establishments in Malaysia
Schools in Malaysia
Education policy in Malaysia